Bankfalu is a neighborhood in the north of Kiskunfélegyháza, in Hungary. Bankfalu is the newest neighborhood in Kiskunfélegyháza.

Notable residents 

 György Mizsei : Hungarian boxer, who won a bronze medal in the light middleweight division at the 1992 Summer Olympics.

References 

 Fekete János: Kiskunfélegyháza településfejlődése és utcaneveinek története, Kiskunfélegyháza, 1974. (Hungarian)
 Fekete János: Kiskunfélegyháza utcanevei, Kiskunfélegyháza 2001.

Populated places in Bács-Kiskun County